Tadeusz Figiel (born 2 July 1948 in Gdańsk) is a Polish mathematician specializing in functional analysis.

Biography 
In 1970 Figiel graduated in mathematics at the University of Warsaw. There Figiel was appointed in 1983 an associate professor and in 1990 a full professor. He is the head of the Gdańsk Branch of the Polish Academy of Sciences and the editor-in-chief of the journal Studia Mathematica.

In 1983 he was an Invited Speaker at the International Congress of Mathematicians in Warsaw.

Selected publications
 with William B. Johnson: "The approximation property does not imply the bounded approximation property." Proceedings of the American Mathematical Society 41 (1973), 197–200. 
 with Wayne J. Davis, William B. Johnson, and Alexander Pelczynski: "Factoring weakly compact operators." Journal of Functional Analysis 17, no. 3 (1974): 311–327.
 with W. B. Johnson. "A uniformly convex Banach space which contains no lp." Compositio Mathematica 29, no. 2 (1974): 179–190.
 with W. B. Johnson and Lior Tzafriri: "On Banach lattices and spaces having local unconditional structure, with applications to Lorentz function spaces." Journal of Approximation Theory 13, no. 4 (1975): 395–412.
 "On the moduli of convexity and smoothness." Studia Mathematica 56, no. 2 (1976): 121–155.
 with Joram Lindenstrauss and Vitali D. Milman: "The dimension of almost spherical sections of convex bodies." Acta Mathematica 139, no. 1 (1977): 53–94. 
 with Z. Ciesielski: "Spline bases in classical function spaces on compact C∞ manifolds, Part II." Studia Mathematica 76, no. 2 (1983): 95–136.
 "Singular integral operators: a martingale approach." Geometry of Banach spaces (Strobl, 1989) 158 (1990): 95–110.
 with Ken Dykema, Gary Weiss, and Mariusz Wodzicki: "Commutator structure of operator ideals." Advances in Mathematics 185, no. 1 (2004): 1– 79.

References

Polish mathematicians
Scientists from Gdańsk
1948 births
Living people
Recipients of the State Award Badge (Poland)